Omar Harfouch  (Arabic: عمر حرفوش; born 20 April 1969 in Tripoli, Lebanon) is a politician and leader of new opposition party the “Third Republic”, and a businessman. Owner of a communications group in Ukraine, he is known in France for his participation in the reality show I'm a Celebrity, Get Me Out of here! and for his many appearances at jet set parties, in videos, and in celebrity magazines. He is a regular donor and guest at AMFAR charity dinner in Cannes.

Career in Ukraine 
Omar Harfouch is of Lebanese origin. In Kyiv, he and his brother Walid Harfouch own the Supernova  media group which includes the FM radio in Ukraine, radio Supernova. He is the publisher and editor of Paparazzi, a magazine in Russian.
 
Declaring that "the world of fashion needed a revolution," he and Walid founded a Geneva-based company in charge of organizing beauty contests in Ukraine in which the jury is composed of Internet users and voters. In 2002, he organized the final of Miss World Net in Tripoli, accompanied by Libyan leader Muammar Gaddafi, despite the international embargo that was imposed on the country at that time.

Career in France 
He became known to the general public in France in April 2006, when he took part in the reality show I'm a Celebrity, Get Me Out of here! for the benefit of Reporters Without Borders. During the show, he became the center of a controversy when he said he was a victim of "racist remarks" (he has black skin) of Marielle Goitschel, who in turn claimed to have treated him as "just a shrimp" (minus in French).

He organized the Miss Europe competition with Endemol, initially presented on TF1, but the channel decided to sell it.

In May 2006, after participating in the radio broadcast of Cauet dechire on Fun Radio, he filed a complaint against Cauet for defamation and racial abuse for statements uttered during the show and published by the magazine Entrevue in July 2006. A few months later, Cauet was found guilty of public defamation of an individual and sentenced to a 500 euro fine and one euro in damages.
 including two against Geneviève de Fontenay, and four against Entrevue.

In October 2006, he released a book, Mystères, scandales et... fortune (Mysteries, Scandals and... Fortune). The same year, he released his autobiography, Omar Harfouch: Confessions of a millionaire.

Public activity 
Harfouch launched a large-scale anti-corruption project in Lebanon. Together with members of the European Parliament, he allegedly discovered in foreign accounts, and also claims to have seized the first $150 million stolen from the Lebanese budget.

Political activity 

Omar Harfouch has campaigned for the establishment of a secular third republic. His positions have been reported in many Lebanese media. He will go as far as announcing the creation of a Lebanese government in exile to get things moving. Then, he will run for the general elections on 15 May 2022 in the Tripoli constituency. He will not be elected, which will not prevent him from continuing to advocate for "a non-confessional elective system that guarantees greater representativeness and greater freedom to Lebanese citizens." The fight against corruption is also a priority for him. At a conference in Rome, in the Italian Parliament, he recalled that "We must fight against the high rate of corruption that affects the country and guarantee the fundamental rights of Lebanese men and women, including the right to inheritance for all, religious freedom and childcare for women. I also intend to draw inspiration from the Italian legal system, as I consider it to be one of the most effective at European level in terms of its approach to fighting organised crime."

From the end of 2022, he will multiply his trips and international meetings to defend his institutional reform project. In Italy, he received the support of MP Roberto Bagnasco (Forza Italia) who, during a colloquium on 9 March 2023, declared: "The attention we pay to Lebanon is dictated by our desire to facilitate its transition to a third republic, more liberal, which goes beyond the confessional scheme, as advocated by our friend Harfouch." He will also receive the support of Carol Moseley-Braun, the first African-American woman to be elected to the US Senate. This close friend of US President Jo Biden said at a press conference on 22 February 2023 that she would speak to the US President about Omar Harfouch and his Third Republic project."

Omar Harfouch has also been noted for his statements on Israel. Following the historic agreement on the maritime border between Lebanon and Israel, he advocates a lasting economic peace and campaigns for peaceful relations between the two countries.

References

External links 
 Personal Website

1969 births
Living people
Lebanese businesspeople
French people of Lebanese descent
Lebanese Sunni Muslims
Lebanese Sunni politicians